Gagie Halt railway station was a railway halt in Scotland, on the Dundee and Forfar direct line, built by the London, Midland and Scottish Railway. It consisted of a single wooden platform built in 1935.

References

Disused railway stations in Angus, Scotland
Former London, Midland and Scottish Railway stations
Railway stations in Great Britain opened in 1935
Railway stations in Great Britain closed in 1955